Rakovets (in the past had the name Mlynivtsi) – is a small village (selo), which is located in Lviv Raion, Lviv Oblast, of Western Ukraine. It belongs to Solonka rural hromada, one of the hromadas of Ukraine.
The village covers an area of 1,28 km2, and the population of the village is just about 207 persons. Local government is administered by Rakovetska village council.

Geography 

History 
Rakovets village was mentioned for the first time in 1484. Its name comes from the crayfish (Rak richkovyy). Originally the village was a town. Then, unable to compete with neighboring Lviv, over the years the city has become a village.

Until 18 July 2020, Rakovets belonged to Pustomyty Raion. The raion was abolished in July 2020 as part of the administrative reform of Ukraine, which reduced the number of raions of Lviv Oblast to seven. The area of Pustomyty Raion was merged into Lviv Raion.

Cult constructions and attractions 
The village has an architectural monument of national importance, the Roman Catholic Church of St. Valentine, which currently is inactive. This Catholic church was built in 1856. In 1890 it was severely damaged, but was later restored.

An architectural monument of local importance in the village is the Church of the Holy Virgin Protection, built in 1904 by the famous Ukrainian architect Vasyl Nahirnyy and the bell tower of the church of the Holy Virgin Protection (wooden). The church belongs to the Diocese of UGCC.

The miraculous spring is at the eastern edge of Rakovets. The spring is very well groomed and refers to the natural monuments.

Gallery

References

External links 
 weather.in.ua, Rakovets' (Lviv region)
 Цілюще джерело / Ukraine / Lvivska / Pustomyty /

Literature 
 Історія міст і сіл УРСР : Львівська область, Пустомитівський район, Раковець. – К. : ГРУРЕ, 1968 р. Page 603 

Villages in Lviv Raion